Grasshopper  is an EP by British rock band Ride, released in November 1992.

It is compilation of two singles for the Japanese market. Tracks 1-3 are from the Leave Them All Behind single. Tracks 4-7 are from the Twisterella single.

In May 2019, Japanese game developer Goichi Suda revealed he was inspired to named his company Grasshopper Manufacture after the song.

Track listing
"Leave Them All Behind"
"Chrome Waves"
"Grasshopper"
"Twisterella"
"Going Blank Again"
"Howard Hughes"
"Stampede"

References

Ride (band) albums
1992 EPs
Creation Records EPs

br:Today Forever